Bernard James Neenan (25 September 1917 – 16 July 1970) was an Australian rules footballer who played for the Melbourne Football Club and South Melbourne Football Club in the Victorian Football League (VFL).

Neenan served in the Australian Army during World War II.

Notes

External links 

Bernie Neenan at Demonwiki

1917 births
Australian rules footballers from Melbourne
Melbourne Football Club players
Sydney Swans players
1970 deaths
People from Prahran, Victoria
Australian Army personnel of World War II
Military personnel from Melbourne